Blutendes Deutschland (English: Bleeding Germany) is a German documentary/propaganda film. Two versions were made, a shorter version in December 1932 and a second one that was released shortly after the Nazi seizure of power in late March 1933. Presented in montage form, sources for the film included old photographs, documents and newsreels. A second section, entitled "Germany Awakens" traced the history of the Nazi party up to the March 1933 German federal election. The film traced the history of Germany from the Franco-Prussian War, the founding of the German Empire, the First World War, the occupation of the Ruhr, the martyrdoms of Albert Leo Schlageter, Horst Wessel and others, the rise of Hitler, the foundation of the Harzburg Front and their eventual victory.

References

External links 

 A brief clip at YouTube
 Blutendes Deutschland short version at Filmportal.de (includes photo gallery)
 Blutendes Deutschland long version at Filmportal.de
 Some posters and other promotional material
 More promotional material

1932 documentary films
1932 films
1933 documentary films
1933 films
Nazi propaganda films
German documentary films
Films of the Weimar Republic
Films of Nazi Germany
German black-and-white films
1930s German films